Elections to the Madhya Pradesh Legislative Assembly were held on 27 November 2003. The Bharatiya Janata Party won a majority of seats and Uma Bharti was sworn in as the new Chief Minister.

Result

Elected Members

References

 http://www.elections.in/madhya-pradesh/assembly-constituencies/2003-election-results.html

State Assembly elections in Madhya Pradesh
2000s in Madhya Pradesh
Madhya